Medroxyprogesterone (MP), is a progestin which is not used medically. A derivative, medroxyprogesterone acetate (MPA), is used as a medication in humans, and is far more widely known in comparison. Medroxyprogesterone is sometimes used as a synonym for medroxyprogesterone acetate, and what is almost always being referred to when the term is used is MPA and not medroxyprogesterone.

Pharmacology

Pharmacodynamics
Compared to MPA, medroxyprogesterone is over two orders of magnitude less potent as a progestogen. Medroxyprogesterone is also notable in that it is a minor metabolite of MPA. In addition to its progestagenic activity, medroxyprogesterone is a weak antiandrogen in vitro on human androgen receptor.

Chemistry

Medroxyprogesterone, also known as 6α-methyl-17α-hydroxyprogesterone or as 6α-methyl-17α-hydroxypregn-4-en-3,20-dione, is a synthetic pregnane steroid and a derivative of progesterone. It is specifically a derivative of 17α-hydroxyprogesterone with a methyl group at the C6α position. The generic name of medroxyprogesterone is a contraction of 6α-methyl-17α-hydroxyprogesterone. It is closely related to medrogestone as well as other unesterified 17α-hydroxyprogesterone derivatives such as chlormadinone, cyproterone, and megestrol.

Society and culture

Generic names

Brand Name

Meprate 10 Tablets (practo)

References 

Abandoned drugs
Tertiary alcohols
Alkene derivatives
Diketones
Pregnanes
Progestogens